Troubadour is the fourth studio album by J. J. Cale. Eric Clapton covered the song "Cocaine" on his 1977 album Slowhand, turning it into one of his biggest hits.

Recording 
Troubadour was produced by Audie Ashworth, who produced Cale's first three studio albums. It sees Cale introducing new instruments to his sound, such as synthesizer on "Ride Me High", with William Ruhlmann of AllMusic noting, "Producer Audie Ashworth introduced some different instruments, notably vibes and what sound like horns (although none are credited), for a slightly altered sound on Troubadour. But J.J. Cale's albums are so steeped in his introspective style that they become interchangeable. If you like one of them, chances are you'll want to have them all." Several noted musicians play on the album, including Ken Buttrey,  Buddy Emmons, and Reggie Young.

In the 2004 documentary To Tulsa and Back, Cale recalled, "I wrote 'Cocaine', and I'm a big fan of Mose Allison...So I had written the song in a Mose Allison bag, kind of cocktail jazz kind of swing...And Audie said, 'That's really a good song, John, but you oughta make that a little more rock and roll, a little more commercial.'  I said, 'Great, man.'  So I went back and recut it again as the thing you heard." The song's meaning is ambiguous, although Eric Clapton describes it as an anti-drug song. He has called the song "quite cleverly anti-cocaine", noting:

Although "Cocaine" would be a major hit for Clapton in 1977, the first single released by Cale from Troubadour in 1976 was the restless "Travelin' Light" with "Hey Baby" as the B-side.  Critics from the music website Alltime Records reviewed the recording: Travelin' Light', with its funky James Burton–style guitar that Jimmy Page tried to copy on "The Crunge", along with great xylophones to fill out the sound – it moves and cooks and rolls and rocks and has just an absolutely earthy quality". The song was released as a part of various compilation albums, including 20th Century Masters – The Millennium Collection: The Best of J.J. Cale in 2002, The Ultimate Collection in 2004 and Classic Album Selection in 2013.  Clapton later covered "Travelin' Light" for his 2001 studio album Reptile. "Travelin' Light" was also recorded by Widespread Panic for their album Space Wrangler in 1988.

Cale's own version of "Travelin' Light" was played to awaken the crews of the Atlantis Space Shuttle and International Space Station preceding their spacewalk early on Friday May 21, 2010.

Track listing 
All songs written by J. J. Cale, except "I'm a Gypsy Man", by Sonny Curtis.

"Hey Baby" – 3:11
"Travelin' Light" – 2:50
"You Got Something" – 4:00
"Ride Me High" – 3:34
"Hold On" – 1:58
"Cocaine" – 2:48
"I'm a Gypsy Man" – 2:42
"The Woman That Got Away" – 2:52
"Super Blue" – 2:40
"Let Me Do It to You" – 2:58
"Cherry" – 3:21
"You Got Me On So Bad" – 3:17

Personnel 
J. J. Cale – vocals, guitar, piano ( tr. 3 ), organ ( tr. 3 ), bass ( tr. 4, 6 ), slide guitar ( tr. 8 ), Electric Guitar, Soloist [First Solo] 
Charles Dungey – bass guitar on tracks 1, 9
Tommy Cogbill – bass guitar on tracks 2, 5, 8, 10-12
Joe Osborn – bass guitar on 3
Bill Raffensperger – bass guitar on track 7
Karl Himmel – drums on tracks 1, 2, 4, 9
Kenny Buttrey – drums on tracks 3, 6, 8, 10
Buddy Harman – drums on tracks 5, 12
Jimmy Karstein – drums on track 7
Kenny Malone – drums on track 11
Gordon Payne – guitar [Twin Guitars]  on track 8
Chuck Browning – guitar [Twin Guitars]  on track 8
Reggie Young – rhythm guitar on tracks 1, 9, el. guitar solo ( tr.6 ), Ac. guitar solo ( tr.9 )
Harold Bradley – rhythm guitar on track 2, Electric Guitar, Soloist [Second Solo] ( tr.12 )
Bill Boatman – rhythm guitar on track 7
Doug Bartenfeld – guitar
Lloyd Green – steel guitar on tracks 1 and 9
Buddy Emmons – steel guitar on track 5
Farrell Morris – percussion, Vibraphone on tracks 2, 9, 11
Audie Ashworth – percussion on track 3
J.I. Allison – percussion on track 7
Don Tweedy – Electronic Wind Instrument ARP ( tr. 3 )
Bobby Woods – piano on track 8
Bill Purcell – piano on track 12
George Tidwell – trumpet on track 10
Dennis Goode – trombone on track 10
Billy Puett – saxophone on track 10

Charts

Weekly charts

Year-end charts

Certifications

References 

1976 albums
J. J. Cale albums
Shelter Records albums
Albums produced by Audie Ashworth